WWTM (1400 AM, "1400 The Team") is a sports/talk formatted radio station licensed to Decatur, Alabama, that serves Decatur, Huntsville, and the northwest Alabama region. The station is owned by Brantley Broadcast Associates, LLC.

Programming
No longer "On Air" Station has gone dark.

The station derives almost all of its programming from ESPN Radio. Weekend programming from other providers includes "Tee It Up" from Fourteenth Colony Productions. Weekend programming during the football season also includes "NFL Preview", "NFL Insider" and "NCAA Football Insider" from Westwood One, plus "Pro Football Weekly" from Syndication Networks.

History
The station started in 1935 as WMSL and was owned by Mutual Savings Life. Later owners included Frank Whisenant and Clete Quick. Under Whisenant, it acquired a sister television station, WMSL-TV (channel 23, now WAFF on channel 48 in Huntsville) and an FM sister (on 92.5 and 102.1, now WVNN-FM).

In March 1987 the call letters were changed to WAVD, which they remained until becoming WWTM, the current call sign, in June 2001.

Before becoming available for this station, the WWTM call letters were most recently otherwise assigned to a station in Worcester, Massachusetts, before it changed to WVEI in August 2000.

References

External links

WTM
ESPN Radio stations
Morgan County, Alabama
Radio stations established in 1935
1935 establishments in Alabama